Peter Mathebula (3 July 1952 – 18 January 2020) was a South African professional boxer who held the WBA flyweight title from 1980 to 1981.

Biography
After he began his professional career in 1971, Mathebula became flyweight in 1978 and bantamweight champion in 1979. Mathebula became WBA World Flyweight Champion on 13 December 1980 after his victory over Kim Tae-shik. However, after his loss to Santos Laciar on 28 March 1981 Mathebula's career declined. He retired in 1983 with a record of 36 wins and 9 losses.

Mathebula was married to Emma Mathebula. She died on the eve of his funeral on 23 January 2020.

References

South African male boxers
1952 births
2020 deaths
Bantamweight boxers
People from Rand West City Local Municipality